Senese may refer to:

 Senese, an adjective for something of, from, or related to Siena (more commonly Sienese in English)
 Senese, a Southern Tuscan dialect
 Senese (surname), a list of notable people with the surname Senese

See also
 Senesi

Language and nationality disambiguation pages